This is a list of left-wing activists in New Zealand.

Living
 Sue Bradford, ex Green Party of New Zealand, ex Unemployed Workers Movement
 Catherine Delahunty, Green Party of New Zealand
 Hone Harawira, ex Māori Party
 Laila Harré, National Distribution Union, ex New Zealand Nurses Organisation, Alliance Party, NewLabour Party, Labour Party
 Tame Iti, Tuhoe, Mana Maori, ex Communist Party of New Zealand
 Jane Kelsey
 Matt McCarten Unite Union, ex Alliance Party, NewLabour Party, Labour Party
 John Minto, Unite Union; Workers' Charter editor; Quality Public Education Coalition spokesperson; Halt All Racist Tours; Global Peace and Justice Auckland
 Grant Morgan, Socialist Worker (Aotearoa), Residents Action Movement, Workers' Charter
 Simon Oosterman, brother to Jonathan; Save Happy Valley Campaign, ex Supersizemypay.com, ex Unite Union, National Distribution Union
 Jill Ovens, Service & Food Workers Union, Alliance Party
 Nándor Tánczos, Green Party of New Zealand, ex Wild Greens, Aotearoa Legalise Cannabis Party, McGillicuddy Serious Party
 Luke Wijohn, Green Party of New Zealand

Deceased
 Bill Andersen, National Distribution Union, Northern Drivers Union, Socialist Party of Aotearoa, Socialist Unity Party, Communist Party of New Zealand
 Hone Heke
 Bruce Jesson, author
 Pat Kelly, trade unionist
 Dean Parker, Workers' Charter
 Eva Rickard, Mana Maori, Mana Motuhake

See also
Socialism in New Zealand

Left-wing activists
Left-wing activists
Left-wing activists
Lists of activists